Chiffon may refer to:

 Chiffon cake, a light, fluffy cake
 Chiffon (fabric), a type of fabric
 Chiffon margarine, a butter substitute
 Chiffonade, a French term for the cutting of herbs or leafy green vegetables into long, thin strips
 The Chiffons, girl group of the 1960s